This is a list of the Australian species of the family Drepanidae. It also acts as an index to the species articles and forms part of the full List of moths of Australia.

Drepaninae
Astatochroa fuscimargo (Warren, 1896)
Cyclura lechriodes (Turner, 1926)
Oreta jaspidea (Warren, 1896)
Tridrepana lunulata (Butler, 1887)

The following species belongs to the subfamily Drepaninae, but has not been assigned to a genus yet. Given here is the original name given to the species when it was first described:
Oreta miltodes Lower, 1903

Unplaced to subfamily
Hypsidia australica (Sick, 1938)
Hypsidia erythropsalis Rothschild, 1896
Hypsidia grisea Scoble & E.D. Edwards, 1988
Hypsidia microspila (Turner, 1942)
Hypsidia niphosema (Lower, 1908)
Hypsidia robinsoni Hacobian, 1986

External links 
Drepanidae at Australian Faunal Directory

Australia